Knotweed is a common name for plants in several genera in the family Polygonaceae. Knotweed may refer to:

 Fallopia
 Persicaria
 Polygonum
 Reynoutria japonica or Japanese knotweed